César Amaris Fernández (born 27 November 1989) is a Venezuelan rower. He competed in the 2020 Summer Olympics.

Notes

References

External links
 
 
 

1989 births
Living people
Sportspeople from Caracas
Rowers at the 2020 Summer Olympics
Venezuelan male rowers
Olympic rowers of Venezuela
Pan American Games medalists in rowing
Pan American Games bronze medalists for Venezuela
Rowers at the 2011 Pan American Games
Medalists at the 2011 Pan American Games
21st-century Venezuelan people